Ferdinand State Forest was formed in 1934 in Dubois County, Indiana, USA. Its west edge is approximately 5 miles to the east of the town of Ferdinand; Indiana State Road 264 connects the town with the forest.

External links
 Official site

Protected areas of Dubois County, Indiana
Indiana state forests
Protected areas established in 1934